The 2000 California wildfire season was a series of wildfires that burned throughout the U.S. state of California during 2000. Cal Fire wildfire suppression costs for fires that burned within the agency's jurisdiction amounted to US$109 million. Damages for the same amounted to $87.3 million, with a total of 389 structures lost. The largest wildfires of the year in California were the Manter and Storrie fires, which burned 74,000 and 55,000 acres in Tulare and Plumas counties respectively.

List of wildfires 
It is excerpted from Cal Fire's 2001 list of large (≥ 300 acres) fires, and may not be complete or reflect the most recent information.

See also 

 List of California wildfires

References

External links 
 California Department of Forestry and Fire Protection (Cal Fire), Statistics and Events

Lists of wildfires in the United States
Wildfires in California by year
2000 wildfires in the United States
2000 California wildfires